Platow is an extinct town in Wayne County, in the U.S. state of Missouri. The GNIS classifies it as a populated place.

It is unknown why the name "Platow" was applied to this community.

References

Ghost towns in Missouri
Former populated places in Wayne County, Missouri